Fuwape is a Nigerian surname. Notable people with the surname include:

Ibiyinka A. Fuwape (born 1962), Nigerian academic, professor in physics 
Joseph Fuwape (born 1957), Nigerian academic

Surnames of Nigerian origin